HMS Seahorse was a 10-gun fireship of the Royal Navy in service from 1694 to 1698, when it was sunk as a breakwater. The ship was raised in 1871 and broken up for lumber.

History 
Seahorse was acquired by the Royal Navy in 1694, when they purchased it from the Dutch. It was first used as a fireship, and then was repurposed into a water boat to carry freshwater to larger warships. It was sunk as a breakwater at Chatham Dockyard, Kent, in 1698.

In 1871, the wreck of Seahorse was discovered while alterations to Chatham Dockyard were being made. It was subsequently excavated for its lumber, the best of which was sound enough for use at the dockyard with the rest being sold at an auction by the Admiralty.

References 

17th-century ships
Scuttled vessels of the United Kingdom
17th-century maritime incidents